Rodrigo Díaz may refer to:

Rodrigo Díaz de Vivar, commonly known as El Cid
Rodrigo Díaz de los Cameros, troubadour
Rodrigo Ezequiel Díaz (born 1981), Argentine footballer
Rodrigo Díaz (equestrian) (born 1978), Colombian Olympic equestrian
Rodrigo Díaz (swimmer) (born 1984), Guatemalan swimmer
Rodrigo Díaz (handballer) (born 1988), Chilean handball player
Rodrigo Díaz (bishop) (died 1249), Roman Catholic prelate
Rodrigo Guirao Díaz (born 1980), Argentine actor
Rodrigo Malmierca Díaz (born 1956), Cuban diplomat and politician